In the initiation ceremonies of the Poro of Sierra Leone, a Senufo bird is a hat worn by men or carried in a procession. Between uses it is kept the Poro’s secret tree grove. The base is hollowed out underneath so that it may fit like a cap on the head of the  wearer.  However, many of the birds stand on cylindrical bases that seem to be designed to rest upon the ground.

The image of a large abstract bird with an equally large beak curved into its own belly. The wings on either side are rectangular with small squares punctured in them Two smaller versions of the bird stand on each shoulder and the wings a decorated with figures on the backside. The legs are slightly bent, standing on a round pedestal and a smaller animal protrudes as the birds tail. This sculpture is made of dark wood and is sometimes decorated with pigment or mud,

According to Senufo belief, the hornbill, along with the tortoise, the crocodile, the chameleon, and the serpent - was one of the first living creatures. The long phallic beak touching its swollen belly suggesting pregnancy, represents the dual forces of  the male and female components, symbolizing the need for both to ensure the continuity of the whole community. The image of this bird is taken from the native yellow-casqued hornbill, which the Senufo believe is the master of all arrogant birds and associated with intellectual power, significant of the knowledge the elders hope to impart on the young initiates.

African sculpture
Ceremonial clothing
Wooden sculptures